The Dragon Who Ate His Tail is a collection of short stories, screenplay fragments and manuscript facsimiles by American writer Ray Bradbury.  It was published by Gauntlet Press in 2007 as a chapbook.  The title story was previously unpublished.

Contents
 "The Dragon Who Ate His Tail"
 "To the Future"
 screenplay pages for "The Fox and the Forest"
 "Sometime Before Dawn"
 "Sometime Before Dawn" (facsimile)

External links
 
 

2007 short story collections
Short story collections by Ray Bradbury